Herbert Jody Maginley (born 7 June 1995) is an Antiguan and Barbudan tennis player.

Maginley has a career high ATP singles ranking of 1021 achieved on 21 October 2019. He also has a career high ATP doubles ranking of 509 achieved on 14 October 2019. He is the only tennis player from Antigua and Barbuda to have an ATP ranking.

Maginley represents Antigua and Barbuda at the Davis Cup, where he has a W/L record of 13–12.

Maginley played college tennis at Northern Kentucky University.

Maginley hasn’t made an ITF final in singles but has made 9 finals in doubles winning 2 of them.

Future and Challenger finals

Doubles 9 (2–7)

Davis Cup

Participations: (13–12)

   indicates the outcome of the Davis Cup match followed by the score, date, place of event, the zonal classification and its phase, and the court surface.

References

External links

1995 births
Living people
People from St. John's, Antigua and Barbuda
Northern Kentucky Norse athletes
Competitors at the 2018 Central American and Caribbean Games
Tennis players at the 2019 Pan American Games
Antigua and Barbuda male tennis players
Pan American Games competitors for Antigua and Barbuda
College men's tennis players in the United States